David Denis Gardner (born 11 September 1940) is a former English cricketer.  Gardner was a right-handed batsman.  He was born at Swindon, Wiltshire.

Gardner made his Minor Counties Championship debut for Wiltshire in 1959 against the Gloucestershire Second XI.  From 1959 to 1970, he represented the county in 33 Minor Counties Championship matches, the last of which came against Berkshire.  In 1976, he returned to play a single Championship match for Wiltshire against Berkshire.

Gardner also represented Wiltshire in 2 List-A matches.  His debut List-A match came against Nottinghamshire in the 1965 Gillette Cup, with his second and final List-A match coming against Essex in the 1969 Gillette Cup.  In his 2 List-A matches, he scored 31 runs at a batting average of 15.50, with a high score of 20.  In the field he took a single catch.

References

External links
David Gardner at Cricinfo
David Gardner at CricketArchive

1940 births
Living people
Sportspeople from Swindon
People from Wiltshire
English cricketers
Wiltshire cricketers